Swami Vivekananda (12 January 1863 – 4 July 1902), born Narendranath Datta, was an Indian Hindu monk, philosopher, author, religious teacher, and the chief disciple of the Indian mystic Ramakrishna. He was a key figure in the introduction of Vedanta and Yoga to the Western world and is credited with raising interfaith awareness, and bringing Hinduism to the status of a major world religion. Vivekananda became a popular figure after the 1893 Parliament of Religions in Chicago, where he began his famous speech with the words, "Sisters and brothers of America...," before introducing Hinduism to Americans. 
He was so impactful at the Parliament that an American newspaper described him as “an orator by divine right and undoubtedly the greatest figure at the Parliament”.
After great success at the Parliament, in the subsequent years, Vivekananda delivered hundreds of lectures across the United States, England and Europe, disseminating the core tenets of Hindu philosophy, and founded the Vedanta Society of New York and the Vedanta Society of San Francisco (now Vedanta Society of Northern California), both of which became the foundations for Vedanta Societies in the West. 

Born into an aristocratic Bengali Kayastha family in Calcutta, Vivekananda was inclined from a young age towards religion and spirituality. He later found his guru, Ramakrishna, and became a monk. After the  death of Ramakrishna, Vivekananda extensively toured the Indian subcontinent, acquiring first-hand knowledge of the living conditions of Indian people in then British India. Moved by their plight, he resolved to help his countrymen, and found a way to travel to the United States where he was highly successful. In India, Vivekananda founded the Ramakrishna Math, which provides spiritual training for monastics and householder devotees, and the Ramakrishna Mission, to provide charity, social work and education. Vivekananda was also a major force in contemporary Hindu reform movements, and contributed to the concept of nationalism in colonial India. He is regarded as a patriotic saint, and his birthday in India is celebrated as National Youth Day.

Early life (1863–1888)

Birth and childhood

Vivekananda was born as Narendranath Datta (name shortened to Narendra or Naren) in a Bengali family in his ancestral home at 3 Gourmohan Mukherjee Street in Calcutta, the capital of British India, on 12 January 1863 during the Makar Sankranti festival. He belonged to a traditional family and was one of nine siblings. His father, Vishwanath Datta, was an attorney at the Calcutta High Court. Durgacharan Datta, Narendra's grandfather was a Sanskrit and Persian scholar who left his family and became a monk at age twenty-five. His mother, Bhubaneswari Devi, was a devout housewife. The progressive, rational attitude of Narendra's father and the religious temperament of his mother helped shape his thinking and personality. Narendranath was interested in spirituality from a young age and used to meditate before the images of deities such as Shiva, Rama, Sita, and Mahavir Hanuman. He was fascinated by wandering ascetics and monks. Narendra was mischievous and restless as a child, and his parents often had difficulty controlling him. His mother said, "I prayed to Shiva for a son and he has sent me one of his demons".

Education 
In 1871, at the age of eight, Narendranath enrolled at Ishwar Chandra Vidyasagar's Metropolitan Institution, where he went to school until his family moved to Raipur in 1877. In 1879, after his family's return to Calcutta, he was the only student to receive first-division marks in the Presidency College entrance examination.  He was an avid reader in a wide range of subjects, including philosophy, religion, history, social science, art and literature. He was also interested in Hindu scriptures, including the Vedas, the Upanishads, the Bhagavad Gita, the Ramayana, the Mahabharata and the Puranas. Narendra was trained in Indian classical music, and regularly participated in physical exercise, sports and organised activities. Narendra studied Western logic, Western philosophy and European history at the General Assembly's Institution (now known as the Scottish Church College). In 1881, he passed the Fine Arts examination, and completed a Bachelor of Arts degree in 1884. Narendra studied the works of David Hume, Immanuel Kant, Johann Gottlieb Fichte, Baruch Spinoza, Georg W. F. Hegel, Arthur Schopenhauer, Auguste Comte, John Stuart Mill and Charles Darwin. He became fascinated with the evolutionism of Herbert Spencer and corresponded with him, translating Herbert Spencer's book Education (1861) into Bengali. While studying Western philosophers, he also learned Sanskrit scriptures and Bengali literature.

William Hastie (principal of Christian College, Calcutta; from where Narendra graduated) wrote, "Narendra is really a genius. I have travelled far and wide but I have never come across a lad of his talents and possibilities, even in German universities, among philosophical students. He is bound to make his mark in life".

Narendra was known for his prodigious memory and the ability at speed reading. Several incidents have been given as examples. In a talk, he once quoted verbatim, two or three pages from Pickwick Papers. Another incident that is given is his argument with a Swedish national where he gave reference to some details on Swedish history that the Swede originally disagreed with but later conceded. In another incident with Dr. Paul Deussen's at Kiel in Germany, Vivekananda was going over some poetical work and did not reply when the professor spoke to him. Later, he apologised to Dr. Deussen explaining that he was too absorbed in reading and hence did not hear him. The professor was not satisfied with this explanation, but Vivekananda quoted and interpreted verses from the text, leaving the professor dumbfounded about his feat of memory. Once, he requested some books written by Sir John Lubbock from a library and returned them the very next day, claiming that he had read them. The librarian refused to believe him, until cross-examination about the contents convinced him that Vivekananda was indeed being truthful.

Some accounts have called Narendra a shrutidhara (a person with a prodigious memory).

Initial spiritual forays

In 1880, Narendra joined Keshab Chandra Sen's Nava Vidhan, which was established by Sen after meeting Ramakrishna and reconverting from Christianity to Hinduism. Narendra became a member of a Freemasonry lodge "at some point before 1884" and of the Sadharan Brahmo Samaj in his twenties, a breakaway faction of the Brahmo Samaj led by Keshab Chandra Sen and Debendranath Tagore. From 1881 to 1884, he was also active in Sen's Band of Hope, which tried to discourage youths from smoking and drinking.

It was in this cultic milieu that Narendra became acquainted with Western esotericism. His initial beliefs were shaped by Brahmo concepts, which denounced polytheism and caste restrictions, and a "streamlined, rationalized, monotheistic theology strongly coloured by a selective and modernistic reading of the Upanisads and of the Vedanta." Rammohan Roy, the founder of the Brahmo Samaj who was strongly influenced by unitarianism, strove towards a universalistic interpretation of Hinduism. His ideas were "altered [...] considerably" by Debendranath Tagore, who had a romantic approach to the development of these new doctrines, and questioned central Hindu beliefs like reincarnation and karma, and rejected the authority of the Vedas. Tagore also brought this "neo-Hinduism" closer in line with western esotericism, a development which was furthered by Sen. Sen was influenced by transcendentalism, an American philosophical-religious movement strongly connected with unitarianism, which emphasised personal religious experience over mere reasoning and theology. Sen strived to "an accessible, non-renunciatory, everyman type of spirituality", introducing "lay systems of spiritual practice" which can be regarded as an influence to the  teachings Vivekananda later popularised in the west.

Not satisfied with his knowledge of philosophy, Narendra came to "the question which marked the real beginning of his intellectual quest for God." He asked several prominent Calcutta residents if they had come "face to face with God", but none of their answers satisfied him. At this time, Narendra met Debendranath Tagore (the leader of Brahmo Samaj) and asked if he had seen God. Instead of answering his question, Tagore said, "My boy, you have the Yogis eyes." According to Banhatti, it was Ramakrishna who really answered Narendra's question, by saying "Yes, I see Him as I see you, only in an infinitely intenser sense." According to De Michelis, Vivekananda was more influenced by the Brahmo Samaj's and its new ideas, than by Ramakrishna. Swami Medhananda agrees that the Brahmo Samaj was a formative influence, but that "it was Narendra's momentous encounter with Ramakrishna that changed the course of his life by turning him away from Brahmoism." According to De Michelis, it was Sen's influence which brought Vivekananda fully into contact with western esotericism, and it was also via Sen that he met Ramakrishna.

Meeting Ramakrishna

In 1881, Narendra first met Ramakrishna, who became his spiritual focus after his own father had died in 1884.

Narendra's first introduction to Ramakrishna occurred in a literature class at General Assembly's Institution when he heard Professor William Hastie lecturing on William Wordsworth's poem, The Excursion. While explaining the word "trance" in the poem, Hastie suggested that his students visit Ramakrishna of Dakshineswar to understand the true meaning of trance. This prompted some of his students (including Narendra) to visit Ramakrishna.

They probably first met personally in November 1881, though Narendra did not consider this their first meeting, and neither man mentioned this meeting later. At this time, Narendra was preparing for his upcoming F. A. examination, when Ram Chandra Datta accompanied him to Surendra Nath Mitra's, house where Ramakrishna was invited to deliver a lecture. According to Makarand Paranjape, at this meeting Ramakrishna asked young Narendra to sing. Impressed by his singing talent, he asked Narendra to come to Dakshineshwar.

In late 1881 or early 1882, Narendra went to Dakshineswar with two friends and met Ramakrishna. This meeting proved to be a turning point in his life. Although he did not initially accept Ramakrishna as his teacher and rebelled against his ideas, he was attracted by his personality and began to frequently visit him at Dakshineswar. He initially saw Ramakrishna's ecstasies and visions as "mere figments of imagination" and "hallucinations". As a member of Brahmo Samaj, he opposed idol worship, polytheism and Ramakrishna's worship of Kali. He even rejected the Advaita Vedanta of "identity with the absolute" as blasphemy and madness, and often ridiculed the idea. Narendra tested Ramakrishna, who faced his arguments patiently: "Try to see the truth from all angles", he replied.

Narendra's father's sudden death in 1884 left the family bankrupt; creditors began demanding the repayment of loans, and relatives threatened to evict the family from their ancestral home. Narendra, once a son of a well-to-do family, became one of the poorest students in his college. He unsuccessfully tried to find work and questioned God's existence, but found solace in Ramakrishna and his visits to Dakshineswar increased.

One day, Narendra requested Ramakrishna to pray to goddess Kali for their family's financial welfare. Ramakrishna instead suggested him to go to the temple himself and pray. Following Ramakrishna's suggestion, he went to the temple thrice, but failed to pray for any kind of worldly necessities and ultimately prayed for true knowledge and devotion from the goddess. Narendra gradually grew ready to renounce everything for the sake of realising God, and accepted Ramakrishna as his Guru.

In 1885, Ramakrishna developed throat cancer, and was transferred to Calcutta and (later) to a garden house in Cossipore. Narendra and Ramakrishna's other disciples took care of him during his last days, and Narendra's spiritual education continued. At Cossipore, he experienced Nirvikalpa samadhi. Narendra and several other disciples received ochre robes from Ramakrishna, forming his first monastic order. He was taught that service to men was the most effective worship of God. Ramakrishna asked him to care of the other monastic disciples, and in turn asked them to see Narendra as their leader. Ramakrishna died in the early-morning hours of 16 August 1886 in Cossipore.

Founding of Ramakrishna Math

After Ramakrishna's death, his devotees and admirers stopped supporting his disciples. Unpaid rent accumulated, and Narendra and the other disciples had to find a new place to live. Many returned home, adopting a Grihastha (family-oriented) way of life. Narendra decided to convert a dilapidated house at Baranagar into a new math (monastery) for the remaining disciples. Rent for the Baranagar Math was low, raised by "holy begging" (mādhukarī). The math became the first building of the Ramakrishna Math: the monastery of the monastic order of Ramakrishna. Narendra and other disciples used to spend many hours in practicing meditation and religious austerities every day. Narendra later reminisced about the early days of the monastery:

In 1887, Narendra compiled a Bengali song anthology named Sangeet Kalpataru with Vaishnav Charan Basak. Narendra collected and arranged most of the songs of this compilation, but could not finish the work of the book for unfavourable circumstances.

Monastic vows
In December 1886, the mother of Baburam invited Narendra and his other brother monks to Antpur village. Narendra and the other aspiring monks accepted the invitation and went to Antpur to spend a few days. In Antpur, on the Christmas Eve of 1886, Narendra and eight other disciples took formal monastic vows. They decided to live their lives as their master lived. Narendranath took the name "Swami Vivekananda".

Travels in India (1888–1893)

In 1888, Narendra left the monastery as a Parivrâjaka— the Hindu religious life of a wandering monk, "without fixed abode, without ties, independent and strangers wherever they go". His sole possessions were a kamandalu (water pot), staff and his two favourite books: the Bhagavad Gita and The Imitation of Christ. Narendra travelled extensively in India for five years, visiting centres of learning and acquainting himself with diverse religious traditions and social patterns. He developed sympathy for the suffering and poverty of the people, and resolved to uplift the nation. Living primarily on bhiksha (alms), Narendra travelled on foot and by railway (with tickets bought by admirers). During his travels he met, and stayed with Indians from all religions and walks of life: scholars, dewans, rajas, Hindus, Muslims, Christians, paraiyars (low-caste workers) and government officials. On 31 May 1893, Narendra left Bombay for Chicago with the name, as suggested by Ajit Singh of Khetri, "Vivekananda"–a conglomerate of the Sanskrit words: viveka and ānanda, meaning "the bliss of discerning wisdom".

First visit to the West (1893–1897)
Vivekananda started his journey to the West on 31 May 1893 and visited several cities in Japan (including Nagasaki, Kobe, Yokohama, Osaka, Kyoto and Tokyo), China and Canada en route to the United States, reaching Chicago on 30 July 1893, where the "Parliament of Religions" took place in September 1893. The Congress was an initiative of the Swedenborgian layman, and judge of the Illinois Supreme Court, Charles C. Bonney, to gather all the religions of the world, and show "the substantial unity of many religions in the good deeds of the religious life." It was one of the more than 200 adjunct gatherings and congresses of the Chicago's World's Fair, and was "an avant-garde intellectual manifestation of [...] cultic milieus, East and West," with the Brahmo Samaj and the Theosophical Society being invited as representative of Hinduism.

Vivekananda wanted to join, but was disappointed to learn that no one without credentials from a bona fide organisation would be accepted as a delegate. Vivekananda contacted Professor John Henry Wright of Harvard University, who invited him to speak at Harvard. Vivekananda wrote of the professor, "He urged upon me the necessity of going to the Parliament of Religions, which he thought would give an introduction to the nation". Vivekananda submitted an application, "introducing himself as a monk 'of the oldest order of sannyāsis ... founded by Sankara,'" supported by the Brahmo Samaj representative Protapchandra Mozoombar, who was also a member of the Parliament's selection committee, "classifying the Swami as a representative of the Hindu monastic order." Hearing Vivekananda speak, Harvard psychology professor William James said, "that man is simply a wonder for oratorical power. He is an honor to humanity."

Parliament of the World's Religions

The Parliament of the World's Religions opened on 11 September 1893 at the Art Institute of Chicago, as part of the World's Columbian Exposition. On this day, Vivekananda gave a brief speech representing India and Hinduism. He was initially nervous, bowed to Saraswati (the Hindu goddess of learning) and began his speech with "Sisters and brothers of America!". At these words, Vivekananda received a two-minute standing ovation from the crowd of seven thousand. According to Sailendra Nath Dhar, when silence was restored he began his address, greeting the youngest of the nations on behalf of "the most ancient order of monks in the world, the Vedic order of sannyasins, a religion which has taught the world both tolerance and universal acceptance". Vivekananda quoted two illustrative passages from the "Shiva mahimna stotram": "As the different streams having their sources in different places all mingle their water in the sea, so, O Lord, the different paths which men take, through different tendencies, various though they appear, crooked or straight, all lead to Thee!" and "Whosoever comes to Me, through whatsoever form, I reach him; all men are struggling through paths that in the end lead to Me." According to Sailendra Nath Dhar, "it was only a short
speech, but it voiced the spirit of the Parliament."

Parliament President John Henry Barrows said, "India, the Mother of religions was represented by Swami Vivekananda, the Orange-monk who exercised the most wonderful influence over his auditors". Vivekananda attracted widespread attention in the press, which called him the "cyclonic monk from India". The New York Critique wrote, "He is an orator by divine right, and his strong, intelligent face in its picturesque setting of yellow and orange was hardly less interesting than those earnest words, and the rich, rhythmical utterance he gave them". The New York Herald noted, "Vivekananda is undoubtedly the greatest figure in the Parliament of Religions. After hearing him we feel how foolish it is to send missionaries to this learned nation". American newspapers reported Vivekananda as "the greatest figure in the parliament of religions" and "the most popular and influential man in the parliament".
The Boston Evening Transcript reported that Vivekananda was "a great favourite at the parliament... if he merely crosses the platform, he is applauded". He spoke several more times "at receptions, the scientific section, and private homes" on topics related to Hinduism, Buddhism and harmony among religions until the parliament ended on 27 September 1893. Vivekananda's speeches at the Parliament had the common theme of universality, emphasising religious tolerance. He soon became known as a "handsome oriental" and made a huge impression as an orator.

Lecture tours in the UK and US

After the Parliament of Religions, he toured many parts of the US as a guest. His popularity opened up new views for expanding on "life and religion to thousands". During a question-answer session at Brooklyn Ethical Society, he remarked, "I have a message to the West as Buddha had a message to the East."

Vivekananda spent nearly two years lecturing in the eastern and central United States, primarily in Chicago, Detroit, Boston, and New York. He founded the Vedanta Society of New York in 1894. By spring 1895 his busy, tiring schedule had affected his health. He ended his lecture tours and began giving free, private classes in Vedanta and yoga. Beginning in June 1895, Vivekananda gave private lectures to a dozen of his disciples at Thousand Island Park, New York for two months.

During his first visit to the West he travelled to the UK twice, in 1895 and 1896, lecturing successfully there. In November 1895, he met Margaret Elizabeth Noble an Irish woman who would become Sister Nivedita. During his second visit to the UK in May 1896 Vivekananda met Max Müller, a noted Indologist from Oxford University who wrote Ramakrishna's first biography in the West. From the UK, Vivekananda visited other European countries. In Germany, he met Paul Deussen, another Indologist. Vivekananda was offered academic positions in two American universities (one the chair in Eastern Philosophy at Harvard University and a similar position at Columbia University); he declined both, since his duties would conflict with his commitment as a monk.

Vivekananda's success led to a change in mission, namely the establishment of Vedanta centres in the West. Vivekananda adapted traditional Hindu ideas and religiosity to suit the needs and understandings of his western audiences, who were especially attracted by and familiar with western esoteric traditions and movements like Transcendentalism and New thought. An important element in his adaptation of Hindu religiosity was the introduction of his "four yogas" model, which includes Raja yoga, his interpretation of Patanjali's Yoga sutras, which offered a practical means to realise the divine force within which is central to modern western esotericism. In 1896, his book Raja Yoga was published, becoming an instant success; it was highly influential in the western understanding of yoga, in Elizabeth de Michelis's view marking the beginning of modern yoga.

Vivekananda attracted followers and admirers in the US and Europe, including Josephine MacLeod, Betty Leggett, Lady Sandwich, William James, Josiah Royce, Robert G. Ingersoll, Lord Kelvin, Harriet Monroe, Ella Wheeler Wilcox, Sarah Bernhardt, Nikola Tesla, Emma Calvé and Hermann Ludwig Ferdinand von Helmholtz. He initiated several followers : Marie Louise (a French woman) became Swami Abhayananda, and Leon Landsberg became Swami Kripananda, so that they could continue the work of the mission of the Vedanta Society. This society still is filled with foreign nationals and is also located in Los Angeles. During his stay in America, Vivekananda was given land in the mountains to the southeast of San Jose, California to establish a retreat for Vedanta students. He called it "Peace retreat", or, Shanti Asrama. The largest American centre is the Vedanta Society of Southern California in Hollywood, one of the twelve main centres. There is also a Vedanta Press in Hollywood which publishes books about Vedanta and English translations of Hindu scriptures and texts. Christina Greenstidel of Detroit was also initiated by Vivekananda with a mantra and she became Sister Christine, and they established a close father–daughter relationship.

From the West, Vivekananda revived his work in India. He regularly corresponded with his followers and brother monks, offering advice and financial support. His letters from this period reflect his campaign of social service, and were strongly worded. He wrote to Akhandananda, "Go from door to door amongst the poor and lower classes of the town of Khetri and teach them religion. Also, let them have oral lessons on geography and such other subjects. No good will come of sitting idle and having princely dishes, and saying "Ramakrishna, O Lord!"—unless you can do some good to the poor". In 1895, Vivekananda founded the periodical Brahmavadin to teach the Vedanta. Later, Vivekananda's translation of the first six chapters of The Imitation of Christ was published in Brahmavadin in 1899. Vivekananda left for India on 16 December 1896 from England with his disciples Captain and Mrs. Sevier and J.J. Goodwin. On the way, they visited France and Italy, and set sail for India from Naples on 30 December 1896. He was later followed to India by Sister Nivedita, who devoted the rest of her life to the education of Indian women and India's independence.

Back in India (1897–1899)
The ship from Europe arrived in Colombo, British Ceylon (now Sri Lanka) on 15 January 1897, and Vivekananda received a warm welcome. In Colombo, he gave his first public speech in the East. From there on, his journey to Calcutta was triumphant. Vivekananda travelled from Colombo to Pamban, Rameswaram, Ramnad, Madurai, Kumbakonam and Madras, delivering lectures. Common people and rajas gave him an enthusiastic reception. During his train travels, people often sat on the rails to force the train to stop, so they could hear him. From Madras (now Chennai), he continued his journey to Calcutta and Almora. While in the West, Vivekananda spoke about India's great spiritual heritage; in India, he repeatedly addressed social issues: uplifting the people, eliminating the caste system, promoting science and industrialisation, addressing widespread poverty and ending colonial rule. These lectures, published as Lectures from Colombo to Almora, demonstrate his nationalistic fervour and spiritual ideology.

On 1 May 1897 in Calcutta, Vivekananda founded the Ramakrishna Mission for social service. Its ideals are based on Karma Yoga, and its governing body consists of the trustees of the Ramakrishna Math (which conducts religious work). Both Ramakrishna Math and Ramakrishna Mission have their headquarters at Belur Math. Vivekananda founded two other monasteries: one in Mayavati in the Himalayas (near Almora), the Advaita Ashrama and another in Madras (now Chennai). Two journals were founded: Prabuddha Bharata in English and Udbhodan in Bengali. That year, famine-relief work was begun by Swami Akhandananda in the Murshidabad district.

Vivekananda earlier inspired Jamsetji Tata to set up a research and educational institution when they travelled together from Yokohama to Chicago on Vivekananda's first visit to the West in 1893. Tata now asked him to head his Research Institute of Science; Vivekananda declined the offer, citing a conflict with his "spiritual interests". He visited Punjab, attempting to mediate an ideological conflict between Arya Samaj (a reformist Hindu movement) and sanatan (orthodox Hindus). After brief visits to Lahore, Delhi and Khetri, Vivekananda returned to Calcutta in January 1898. He consolidated the work of the math and trained disciples for several months. Vivekananda composed "Khandana Bhava–Bandhana", a prayer song dedicated to Ramakrishna, in 1898.

Second visit to the West and final years (1899–1902)

Despite declining health, Vivekananda left for the West for a second time in June 1899 accompanied by Sister Nivedita and Swami Turiyananda. Following a brief stay in England, he went to the United States. During this visit, Vivekananda established Vedanta Societies in San Francisco and New York and founded a shanti ashrama (peace retreat) in California. He then went to Paris for the Congress of Religions in 1900. His lectures in Paris concerned the worship of the lingam and the authenticity of the Bhagavad Gita. Vivekananda then visited Brittany, Vienna, Istanbul, Athens and Egypt. The French philosopher Jules Bois was his host for most of this period, until he returned to Calcutta on 9 December 1900.

After a brief visit to the Advaita Ashrama in Mayavati, Vivekananda settled at Belur Math, where he continued co-ordinating the works of Ramakrishna Mission, the math and the work in England and the US. He had many visitors, including royalty and politicians. Although Vivekananda was unable to attend the Congress of Religions in 1901 in Japan due to deteriorating health, he made pilgrimages to Bodhgaya and Varanasi. Declining health (including asthma, diabetes and chronic insomnia) restricted his activity.

Death
On 4 July 1902 (the day of his death), Vivekananda awoke early, went to the monastery at Belur Math and meditated for three hours. He taught Shukla-Yajur-Veda, Sanskrit grammar and the philosophy of yoga to pupils, later discussing with colleagues a planned Vedic college in the Ramakrishna Math. At 7:00 pm Vivekananda went to his room, asking not to be disturbed; he died at 9:20 p.m. while meditating. According to his disciples, Vivekananda attained mahasamādhi; the rupture of a blood vessel in his brain was reported as a possible cause of death. His disciples believed that the rupture was due to his brahmarandhra (an opening in the crown of his head) being pierced when he attained mahasamādhi. Vivekananda fulfilled his prophecy that he would not live forty years. He was cremated on a sandalwood funeral pyre on the bank of the Ganga in Belur, opposite where Ramakrishna was cremated sixteen years earlier.

Teachings and philosophy

While synthesizing and popularizing various strands of Hindu-thought, most notably classical yoga and (Advaita) Vedanta, Vivekananda was influenced by western ideas such as Universalism, via Unitarian missionaries who collaborated with the Brahmo Samaj. His initial beliefs were shaped by Brahmo concepts, which included belief in a formless God and the deprecation of idolatry, and a "streamlined, rationalized, monotheistic theology strongly coloured by a selective and modernistic reading of the Upanisads and of the Vedanta". He propagated the idea that "the divine, the absolute, exists within all human beings regardless of social status", and that "seeing the divine as the essence of others will promote love and social harmony". Via his affiliations with Keshub Chandra Sen's Nava Vidhan, the Freemasonry lodge, the Sadharan Brahmo Samaj, and Sen's Band of Hope, Vivekananda became acquainted with Western esotericism.

He was also influenced by Ramakrishna, who gradually brought Narendra to a Vedanta-based worldview that "provides the ontological basis for 'śivajñāne jīver sevā', the spiritual practice of serving human beings as actual manifestations of God."

Vivekananda propagated that the essence of Hinduism was best expressed in Adi Shankara's Advaita Vedanta philosophy. Nevertheless, following Ramakrishna, and in contrast to Advaita Vedanta, Vivekananda believed that the Absolute is both immanent and transcendent. According to Anil Sooklal, Vivekananda's neo-Vedanta "reconciles Dvaita or dualism and Advaita or non-dualism," viewing Brahman as "one without a second," yet "both qualified, saguna, and qualityless, nirguna." Vivekananda summarised the Vedanta as follows, giving it a modern and Universalistic interpretation, showing the influence of classical yoga:

Vivekananda's emphasis on nirvikalpa samadhi was preceded by medieval yogic influences on Advaita Vedanta. In line with Advaita Vedanta texts like Dŗg-Dŗśya-Viveka (14th century) and Vedantasara (of Sadananda) (15th century), Vivekananda saw samadhi as a means to attain liberation.

Vivekananda popularized the notion of involution, a term which Vivekananda probably took from western Theosophists, notably Helena Blavatsky, in addition to Darwin's notion of evolution, and possibly referring to the Samkhya term sātkarya. Theosophic ideas on involution has "much in common" with "theories of the descent of God in Gnosticism, Kabbalah, and other esoteric schools." According to Meera Nanda, "Vivekananda uses the word involution exactly how it appears in Theosophy: the descent, or the involvement, of divine cosnciousness into matter." With spirit, Vivekananda refers to prana or purusha, derived ("with some original twists") from Samkhya and classical yoga as presented by Patanjali in the Yoga sutras.

Vivekananda linked morality with control of the mind, seeing truth, purity and unselfishness as traits which strengthened it. He advised his followers to be holy, unselfish and to have shraddhā (faith). Vivekananda supported brahmacharya, believing it the source of his physical and mental stamina and eloquence.

Vivekananda's acquaintance with Western esotericism made him very successful in Western esoteric circles, beginning with his speech in 1893 at the Parliament of Religions. Vivekananda adapted traditional Hindu ideas and religiosity to suit the needs and understandings of his Western audiences, who were especially attracted by and familiar with Western esoteric traditions and movements like Transcendentalism and New thought. An important element in his adaptation of Hindu religiosity was the introduction of his four yoga's model, which includes Raja yoga, his interpretation of Patanjali's Yoga sutras, which offered a practical means to realize the divine force within which is central to modern Western esotericism. In 1896, his book Raja Yoga was published, which became an instant success and was highly influential in the Western understanding of yoga.

Nationalism was a prominent theme in Vivekananda's thought. He believed that a country's future depends on its people, and his teachings focused on human development. He wanted "to set in motion a machinery which will bring noblest ideas to the doorstep of even the poorest and the meanest".

Influence and legacy

Neo-Vedanta
Vivekananda was one of the main representatives of Neo-Vedanta, a modern interpretation of selected aspects of Hinduism in line with western esoteric traditions, especially Transcendentalism, New Thought and Theosophy. His reinterpretation was, and is, very successful, creating a new understanding and appreciation of Hinduism within and outside India, and was the principal reason for the enthusiastic reception of yoga, Transcendental Meditation and other forms of Indian spiritual self-improvement in the West. Agehananda Bharati explained, "...modern Hindus derive their knowledge of Hinduism from Vivekananda, directly or indirectly". Vivekananda espoused the idea that all sects within Hinduism (and all religions) are different paths to the same goal. However, this view has been criticised as an oversimplification of Hinduism.

Indian nationalism
In the background of emerging nationalism in British-ruled India, Vivekananda crystallised the nationalistic ideal. In the words of social reformer Charles Freer Andrews, "The Swami's intrepid patriotism gave a new colour to the national movement throughout India. More than any other single individual of that period Vivekananda had made his contribution to the new awakening of India". Vivekananda drew attention to the extent of poverty in the country, and maintained that addressing such poverty was a prerequisite for national awakening. His nationalistic ideas influenced many Indian thinkers and leaders. Sri Aurobindo regarded Vivekananda as the one who awakened India spiritually. Mahatma Gandhi counted him among the few Hindu reformers "who have maintained this Hindu religion in a state of splendor by cutting down the dead wood of tradition".

Name-giving
In 2011, the West Bengal Police Training College was renamed the Swami Vivekananda State Police Academy, West Bengal. The state technical university in Chhattisgarh has been named the Chhattisgarh Swami Vivekanand Technical University. In 2012, the Raipur airport was renamed Swami Vivekananda Airport.

Celebrations
While National Youth Day in India is observed on his birthday, 12 January, the day he delivered his masterful speech at the Parliament of Religions, 11 September 1893, is "World Brotherhood Day". The 150th birth anniversary of Swami Vivekananda was celebrated in India and abroad. The Ministry of Youth Affairs and Sports in India officially observed 2013 as the occasion in a declaration.

Movies
Indian film director Utpal Sinha made a film, The Light: Swami Vivekananda as a tribute for his 150th birth anniversary. Other Indian films about his life include: Swamiji (1949) by Amar Mullick, Swami Vivekananda (1955) by Amar Mullick, Birieswar Vivekananda (1964) by Modhu Bose, Life and Message of Swami Vivekananda (1964) documentary film by Bimal Roy, Swami Vivekananda (1998) by G. V. Iyer, Swamiji (2012) laser light film by Manick Sorcar. Sound of Joy, an Indian 3D-animated short film directed by Sukankan Roy depicts the spiritual journey of Vivekananda. It won the National Film Award for Best Non-Feature Animation Film in 2014.

Works

Lectures
Although Vivekananda was a powerful orator and writer in English and Bengali, he was not a thorough scholar, and most of his published works were compiled from lectures given around the world which were "mainly delivered [...] impromptu and with little preparation". His main work, Raja Yoga, consists of talks he delivered in New York.

Literary works
Bartaman Bharat meaning "Present Day India" is an erudite Bengali language essay written by him, which was first published in the March 1899 issue of Udbodhan, the only Bengali language magazine of Ramakrishna Math and Ramakrishna Mission. The essay was reprinted as a book in 1905 and later compiled into the fourth volume of The Complete Works of Swami Vivekananda.  In this essay his refrain to the readers was to honour and treat every Indian as a brother irrespective of whether he was born poor or in lower caste.

Publications

Published in his lifetime
 Sangeet Kalpataru (1887, with Vaishnav Charan Basak)
 Karma Yoga (1896)
 Raja Yoga (1896 [1899 edition])
 Vedanta Philosophy: An address before the Graduate Philosophical Society (1896)
 Lectures from Colombo to Almora (1897)
 Bartaman Bharat  (March 1899), Udbodhan
 My Master (1901), The Baker and Taylor Company, New York
 Vedânta philosophy: lectures on Jnâna Yoga (1902) Vedânta Society, New York 
  Jnana yoga (1899)
 
 
Published posthumously
Published after his death (1902)
 Addresses on Bhakti Yoga
 Bhakti Yoga
 The East and the West (1909)
 Inspired Talks (1909)
 Narada Bhakti Sutras – translation
 Para Bhakti or Supreme Devotion
 Practical Vedanta
 Speeches and writings of Swami Vivekananda; a comprehensive collection
 Complete Works: a collection of his writings, lectures and discourses in a set of nine volumes
 Seeing Beyond the Circle (2005)

See also

 List of Hindu gurus and saints
 Ātman
 Self-control and discipline
 Soul
 Vivekananda Vidyaniketan Educational Institutions
 Yoga
 Ashtanga yoga
 Bhakti yoga
 Karma yoga
 Jnana yoga

Notes

References

Sources

Further reading

 

Majumdar, R. C. (1999). Swami Vivekananda: A historical review. Calcutta: Advaita Ashrama.

External links

  
 Works about Vivekananda via the Open Library
 Works by Vivekananda via the Open Library
 
  
 Biography at Belur Math's official website
 Complete Works of Vivekananda, Belur Math publication

 
1863 births
1902 deaths
Hindu new religious movements
Founders of new religious movements
Ascetics
Bengali people
Hindu philosophers and theologians
19th-century Hindu philosophers and theologians
Indian Hindu missionaries
Indian theologians
Hindu revivalists
People in interfaith dialogue
Indian Hindu saints
Indian Hindu spiritual teachers
Indian yoga gurus
Monastic disciples of Ramakrishna
New Age predecessors
People from Kolkata
Presidency University, Kolkata alumni
Ramakrishna Mission
Scottish Church College alumni
Spiritual practice
University of Calcutta alumni
Vedanta
Hindu reformers
Neo-Vedanta
Bengali Hindu saints
Indian Freemasons
Anti-caste activists
Modern yoga gurus
People associated with Shillong